Bernardo San Juan (born 12 March 1924, date of death unknown) was a Filipino sports shooter. He competed at the 1960, 1964 and 1968 Summer Olympics and 1966 Asian Games.

References

External links
 

1924 births
Year of death missing
Filipino male sport shooters
Olympic shooters of the Philippines
Shooters at the 1960 Summer Olympics
Shooters at the 1964 Summer Olympics
Shooters at the 1968 Summer Olympics
Sportspeople from Rizal
Asian Games medalists in shooting
Shooters at the 1966 Asian Games
Asian Games silver medalists for the Philippines
Medalists at the 1966 Asian Games
20th-century Filipino people